Harald Heckmann (born 6 December 1924) is a German musicologist.

Life 
Born in Dortmund, Heckmann studied musicology with Reinhold Hammerstein, Hermann Zenck and Wilibald Gurlitt as well as art history with Kurt Bauch, history of German literature with Walther Rehm and history with Gerd Tellenbach and Gerhard Ritter in Freiburg im Breisgau. During his studies he became a member of the AMV Alt-Strasbourg Freiburg. He received his doctorate in 1952, was assistant to Wilibald Gurlitt until 1954, collaborator on the handbook of musical terminology of the Academy of Sciences and Literature Mainz and taught Protestant church music history and hymnology at the Musikhochschule Freiburg.

From 1971 until his retirement in 1991, he was chairman of the German Broadcasting Archive in Frankfurt, a foundation of the ARD.

Voluntary functions 
From 1959 to 1974, Heckmann was first Secretary General, then until 1977 President of the International Association of Music Libraries, Archives and Documentation Centres (international name: Association International des Bibliothèques Musicales, in short: AIBM). After his presidency he was appointed Honorary President of the Association. Between 1960 and 1980, he was also secretary, then until 2004 president of the Répertoire International des Sources Musicales. (RISM), where he is now also Honorary President. From 1971 to 2002 Heckmann was a member of the German Music History Commission. In 1971, he was with Barry S. Brook and Geneviève Thibault de Chambure, the founder of the Répertoire International d'Iconographie Musicale (RIdIM), where he was vice president until 1989. In 1967 he was also co-founder and until 1992 vice president of the Répertoire International de Littérature Musicale (RILM). 
Together with Gerhard Mantel, from 1983 to 2009 he was responsible for the chamber music programmes of the Robert Schumann Society Frankfurt am Main. Heckmann received the Kassel City Medal in 1979, the Golden Mozart Pin of the International Mozarteum Foundation in 1988 and the Federal Cross of Merit 1st Class in 2000.

Publications 
Books
 Wolfgang Caspar Printz (1641–1717) und seine Rhythmuslehre. Diss. phil. Freiburg i. Br. 1952 (mschr.)
 Elektronische Data processing in der Musikwissenschaft, Regensburg 1967.

Essais 
Arbeiten zur Musikdokumentation, zur Überlieferungsgeschichte der Musik, zur Musik-Ikonographie, zum Einsatz der EDV in der Musikwissenschaft, zur Aufführungspraxis älterer Musik among others

Editions
 Deutsches Musikgeschichtliches Archiv Kassel. Katalog der Filmsammlung, Kassel/Basel, continuously from 1953 to 1972
 Documenta Musicologica, Reihe I Druckschriften–Faksimiles, Kassel among others 1953; series II, Handschriften–Faksimiles ebd. 1955ff. (from 1961 to 1972 Chairman of the respective editorial committees of both series) 
 Kgr. Ber. Gesellschaft für Musikforschung Hamburg 1956, Kassel/ Basel 1957 (with W. Gerstenberg and H. Husmann)
 Catalogus Musicus, Eine musikbibliographische Reihe (1963 bis 1969 Vorsitzender des Publikationsausschusses, from 1979 until 1973 together with H. Heussner)
 S. de Brossard: Dict. de musique. Seconde édition 1705, Faks. with Einl., Hilversum 1965 
 FS. Vladimir Fédorov, Fontes Artis Musicae 13/1,1966 (with Wolfgang Rehm)
 Das Tenorlied, Mehrstimmige Lieder in deutschen Quellen 1450–1580, ed. by Dt. Musikgesch. Arch. Kassel und dem  Staatl. Institut für Musikforschung Preuß. Kulturbesitz Berlin, vol. 1: Drucke, Kassel among others 1979, vol. 2: Handschriften., ed. 1982, vol. 3: Register, 1986 (with Norbert Böker-Heil and Ilse Kindermann)
 FS. Wolfgang Rehm, Kassel among others 1989 (with Dietrich Berke)
 Musikalische Ikonographie, Tagungsber. Hamburg 1991, Laaber 1994 (with Monika Holl and Hans Joachim Marx)
 Nachschlagewerke zur Musik. Internationale Musik-Sach-Lexika vom 17. bis zum frühen 19. Jh., Mikfrofiche-Edition, Munich 1999.

Music editions
 W. A. Mozart, Chöre und Zwischenaktmusiken zu Thamos, König in Ägypten, KV 345 (336a), Neue Mozart Ausgabe (NMA) II/6, vol. 1, Kassel among others. 1956, 2/1973; 1958
 W. A. Mozart, Musik zu Pantomimen und Balletten, NMA II/6, vol. 22, 1963. 
 Chr. W. Gluck, La Rencontre imprévue/ Die Pilger von Mekka; Sämtl. Werke IV, vol. 7, 1964.

Further reading 
 Musikdokumentation gestern, heute und morgen, Festschrift Harald Heckmann,  ed. by Wolfgang Rehm, Kassel 1984 [with complete index of writings to date]
 Article about Heckmann in Die Musik in Geschichte und Gegenwart, 1st and 2nd edition; Grove Dictionary of Music und The New Grove, Kürschners Gelehrtenlexikon.

References

External links 
 

German musicologists
Academic staff of the Hochschule für Musik Freiburg
German music publishers (people)
Officers Crosses of the Order of Merit of the Federal Republic of Germany
1924 births
Living people
Writers from Dortmund